Wolfgang Amadeus Mozart monument was erected in Baku, in 2011. It is dedicated Wolfgang Amadeus Mozart, an Austrian composer. The statue was put up on October 12, 2011, in Baku. President of Azerbaijan Ilham Aliyev and president of Austria Heinz Fischer inaugurated the monument. The author of the statue is an architect and painter Chingiz Farzaliyev and sculptor Natig Aliyev. The area around of the monument has been renovated and a park was built on an area of 2,300 square meters.

References 

Statues in Baku